The 2022–23 San Miguel Beermen season is the 47th season of the franchise in the Philippine Basketball Association (PBA).

Key dates
May 15: The PBA Season 47 draft was held at the Robinsons Place Manila in Manila.

Draft picks

Roster

Philippine Cup

Eliminations

Standings

Game log

|-bgcolor=ccffcc
| 1
| June 8
| Phoenix
| W 108–100
| Fajardo, Manuel (24)
| June Mar Fajardo (15)
| Chris Ross (12)
| Smart Araneta Coliseum
| 1–0
|-bgcolor=ccffcc
| 2
| June 10
| NLEX
| W 100–92
| CJ Perez (19)
| June Mar Fajardo (14)
| CJ Perez (5)
| Ynares Center
| 2–0
|-bgcolor=ccffcc
| 3
| June 17
| Magnolia
| W 87–81
| Moala Tautuaa (19)
| CJ Perez (12)
| Jericho Cruz (7)
| Ynares Center
| 3–0
|-bgcolor=ffcccc
| 4
| June 24
| Barangay Ginebra
| L 72–75
| Simon Enciso (18)
| June Mar Fajardo (17)
| Cruz, Lassiter, Tautuaa (3)
| SM Mall of Asia Arena
| 3–1
|-bgcolor=ccffcc
| 5
| June 26
| Converge
| W 111–92
| Jericho Cruz (22)
| June Mar Fajardo (16)
| CJ Perez (12)
| Ynares Center
| 4–1
|-bgcolor=ccffcc
| 6
| June 29
| Rain or Shine
| W 99–93
| CJ Perez (21)
| June Mar Fajardo (16)
| June Mar Fajardo (7)
| Smart Araneta Coliseum
| 5–1

|-bgcolor=ccffcc
| 7
| July 2
| NorthPort
| W 122–106
| Fajardo, Herndon (21)
| Brondial, Fajardo, Perez (9)
| CJ Perez (12)
| Smart Araneta Coliseum
| 6–1
|-bgcolor=ccffcc
| 8
| July 7
| TNT
| W 115–99
| Cruz, Fajardo (30)
| Rodney Brondial (18)
| CJ Perez (10)
| Smart Araneta Coliseum
| 7–1
|-bgcolor=ccffcc
| 9
| July 10
| Blackwater
| W 110–107 (OT)
| Cruz, Fajardo (25)
| June Mar Fajardo (18)
| CJ Perez (5)
| Smart Araneta Coliseum10,308
| 8–1
|-bgcolor=ccffcc
| 10
| July 14
| Terrafirma
| W 109–108 (OT)
| June Mar Fajardo (26)
| June Mar Fajardo (10)
| June Mar Fajardo (9)
| Smart Araneta Coliseum
| 9–1
|-bgcolor=ffcccc
| 11
| July 17
| Meralco
| L 86–89
| June Mar Fajardo (21)
| June Mar Fajardo (12)
| CJ Perez (6)
| Smart Araneta Coliseum
| 9–2

Playoffs

Bracket

Game log

|-bgcolor=ccffcc
| 1
| July 27
| Blackwater
| W 123–93
| Lassiter, Perez (18)
| Rodney Brondial (15)
| Chris Ross (12)
| Smart Araneta Coliseum
| 1–0

|-bgcolor=ccffcc
| 1
| August 3
| Meralco
| W 121–97
| CJ Perez (25)
| Rodney Brondial (11)
| Cruz, Fajardo (5)
| Smart Araneta Coliseum
| 1–0
|-bgcolor=ffcccc
| 2
| August 5
| Meralco
| L 88–99
| June Mar Fajardo (22)
| June Mar Fajardo (17)
| Jericho Cruz (5)
| Smart Araneta Coliseum
| 1–1
|-bgcolor=ccffcc
| 3
| August 7
| Meralco
| W 96–91
| CJ Perez (26)
| June Mar Fajardo (16)
| Ross, Tautuaa (5)
| Smart Araneta Coliseum
| 2–1
|-bgcolor=ffcccc
| 4
| August 10
| Meralco
| L 97–111
| CJ Perez (24)
| June Mar Fajardo (13)
| Cruz, Perez (4)
| Smart Araneta Coliseum
| 2–2
|-bgcolor=ccffcc
| 5
| August 12
| Meralco
| W 89–78
| CJ Perez (25)
| June Mar Fajardo (15)
| CJ Perez (5)
| Smart Araneta Coliseum
| 3–2
|-bgcolor=ffcccc
| 6
| August 14
| Meralco
| L 92–96
| June Mar Fajardo (23)
| June Mar Fajardo (13)
| Cruz, Tautuaa (3)
| Smart Araneta Coliseum9,439
| 3–3
|-bgcolor=ccffcc
| 7
| August 17
| Meralco
| W 100–89
| June Mar Fajardo (29)
| June Mar Fajardo (14)
| CJ Perez (9)
| Smart Araneta Coliseum
| 4–3

|-bgcolor=ffcccc
| 1
| August 21
| TNT
| L 84–86
| June Mar Fajardo (24)
| June Mar Fajardo (16)
| Simon Enciso (4)
| Smart Araneta Coliseum8,458
| 0–1
|-bgcolor=ccffcc
| 2
| August 24
| TNT
| W 109–100
| CJ Perez (23)
| June Mar Fajardo (8)
| Chris Ross (10)
| Smart Araneta Coliseum
| 1–1
|-bgcolor=ccffcc
| 3
| August 26
| TNT
| W 108–100
| June Mar Fajardo (27)
| June Mar Fajardo (27)
| Chris Ross (5)
| SM Mall of Asia Arena
| 2–1
|-bgcolor=ffcccc
| 4
| August 28
| TNT
| L 87–100
| June Mar Fajardo (20)
| June Mar Fajardo (19)
| Enciso, Perez (4)
| Smart Araneta Coliseum10,569
| 2–2
|-bgcolor=ffcccc
| 5
| August 31
| TNT
| L 93–102
| June Mar Fajardo (20)
| June Mar Fajardo (16)
| CJ Perez (7)
| Smart Araneta Coliseum
| 2–3
|-bgcolor=ccffcc
| 6
| September 2
| TNT
| W 114–96
| Marcio Lassiter (22)
| June Mar Fajardo (12)
| June Mar Fajardo (5)
| Smart Araneta Coliseum
| 3–3
|-bgcolor=ccffcc
| 7
| September 4
| TNT
| W 119–97
| CJ Perez (25)
| June Mar Fajardo (18)
| CJ Perez (7)
| Smart Araneta Coliseum15,195
| 4–3

Commissioner's Cup

Eliminations

Standings

Game log

|-bgcolor=ffcccc
| 1
| October 5, 2022
| Blackwater
| L 106–109
| June Mar Fajardo (23)
| June Mar Fajardo (16)
| Simon Enciso (7)
| Smart Araneta Coliseum
| 0–1
|-bgcolor=ccffcc
| 2
| October 9, 2022
| Rain or Shine
| W 113–105
| Diamond Stone (42)
| Diamond Stone (13)
| Chris Ross (5)
| PhilSports Arena
| 1–1
|-bgcolor=ffcccc
| 3
| October 16, 2022
| Bay Area
| L 87–113
| CJ Perez (19)
| Diamond Stone (14)
| CJ Perez (6)
| Smart Araneta Coliseum
| 1–2
|-bgcolor=ffcccc
| 4
| October 21, 2022
| Converge
| L 102–106
| CJ Perez (29)
| Devon Scott (15)
| Devon Scott (6)
| PhilSports Arena
| 1–3
|-bgcolor=ccffcc
| 5
| October 23, 2022
| NLEX
| W 124–116
| Devon Scott (26)
| Devon Scott (10)
| Devon Scott (7)
| SM Mall of Asia Arena12,087
| 2–3
|-bgcolor=ccffcc
| 6
| October 26, 2022
| NorthPort
| W 104–86
| Devon Scott (25)
| Devon Scott (16)
| Moala Tautuaa (7)
| Ynares Center
| 3–3

|-bgcolor=ffcccc
| 7
| November 6, 2022
| Barangay Ginebra
| L 96–97
| Devon Scott (26)
| Devon Scott (21)
| Perez, Tautuaa (5)
| Smart Araneta Coliseum10,149
| 3–4
|-bgcolor=ffcccc
| 8
| November 16, 2022
| Magnolia
| L 80–85
| Devon Scott (19)
| Devon Scott (17)
| Chris Ross (7)
| Smart Araneta Coliseum
| 3–5
|-bgcolor=ccffcc
| 9
| November 19, 2022
| Phoenix
| W 108–104
| Simon Enciso (20)
| Devon Scott (14)
| Devon Scott (6)
| PhilSports Arena
| 4–5
|-bgcolor=ccffcc
| 10
| November 23, 2022
| Terrafirma
| W 131–103
| Jericho Cruz (25)
| Devon Scott (19)
| Devon Scott (11)
| PhilSports Arena
| 5–5
|-bgcolor=ccffcc
| 11
| November 26, 2022
| TNT
| W 119–99
| Devon Scott (28)
| Devon Scott (14)
| Simon Enciso (7)
| PhilSports Arena
| 6–5

|-bgcolor=ccffcc
| 12
| December 2, 2022
| Meralco
| W 113–108
| Devon Scott (32)
| Devon Scott (13)
| Simon Enciso (7)
| PhilSports Arena
| 7–5

Playoffs

Bracket

Game log

|-bgcolor=ccffcc
| 1
| December 7, 2022
| Converge
| W 114–96
| CJ Perez (25)
| June Mar Fajardo (16)
| Simon Enciso (10)
| PhilSports Arena
| 1–0
|-bgcolor=ccffcc
| 2
| December 10, 2022
| Converge
| W 120–107
| Terrence Romeo (22)
| June Mar Fajardo (18)
| Enciso, Fajardo (7)
| PhilSports Arena
| 2–0

|-bgcolor=ffcccc
| 1
| December 14, 2022
| Bay Area
| L 102–103
| CJ Perez (24)
| Fajardo, Scott (8)
| Devon Scott (8)
| PhilSports Arena
| 0–1
|-bgcolor=ffcccc
| 2
| December 16, 2022
| Bay Area
| L 95–114
| June Mar Fajardo (35)
| June Mar Fajardo (10)
| Devon Scott (6)
| PhilSports Arena
| 0–2
|-bgcolor=ccffcc
| 3
| December 18, 2022
| Bay Area
| W 98–96
| Devon Scott (25)
| June Mar Fajardo (16)
| Simon Enciso (7)
| PhilSports Arena
| 1–2
|-bgcolor=ffcccc
| 4
| December 21, 2022
| Bay Area
| L 92–94
| CJ Perez (28)
| Devon Scott (19)
| Devon Scott (8)
| SM Mall of Asia Arena
| 1–3

Governors' Cup

Eliminations

Standings

Game log

|-bgcolor=ccffcc
| 1
| January 29
| Phoenix
| W 114–93
| Cameron Clark (23)
| June Mar Fajardo (13)
| Simon Enciso (9)
| Ynares Center
| 1–0

|-bgcolor=ccffcc
| 2
| February 1
| Blackwater
| W 105–86
| Jericho Cruz (22)
| June Mar Fajardo (16)
| Enciso, Ross (7)
| PhilSports Arena
| 2–0
|-bgcolor=ccffcc
| 3
| February 3
| Terrafirma
| W 122–102 
| Cameron Clark (31)
| Cameron Clark (14)
| Simon Enciso (8)
| Ynares Center
| 3–0
|-bgcolor=ccffcc
| 4
| February 5
| Magnolia
| W 100–98
| Cameron Clark (19)
| Clark, Fajardo (10)
| Simon Enciso (9)
| Smart Araneta Coliseum10,080
| 4–0
|-bgcolor=ccffcc
| 5
| February 9
| Meralco
| W 94–86
| Cameron Clark (28)
| June Mar Fajardo (14)
| Cameron Clark (5)
| Smart Araneta Coliseum
| 5–0
|-bgcolor=ffcccc
| 6
| February 11
| Converge
| L 103–107 
| Cameron Clark (30)
| Cameron Clark (12)
| Simon Enciso (9)
| SM Mall of Asia Arena
| 5–1
|-bgcolor=ccffcc
| 7
| February 15
| NorthPort
| W 145–132 
| Cameron Clark (44)
| June Mar Fajardo (12)
| Simon Enciso (13)
| SM Mall of Asia Arena
| 6–1
|-bgcolor=ccffcc
| 8
| February 17
| Barangay Ginebra
| W 102–99
| Cameron Clark (35)
| June Mar Fajardo (18)
| Simon Enciso (8)
| Smart Araneta Coliseum
| 7–1
|-bgcolor=ffcccc
| 9
| February 19
| TNT
| L 103–105 
| Cameron Clark (30)
| June Mar Fajardo (13)
| Chris Ross (6)
| PhilSports Arena
| 7–2

|- align="center"
|colspan="9" bgcolor="#bbcaff"|All-Star Break
|-bgcolor=ccffcc
| 10
| March 15
| NLEX
| W 120–106 
| Cameron Clark (45)
| Cameron Clark (17)
| Enciso, Lassiter, Perez (4)
| PhilSports Arena
| 8–2
|-bgcolor=ccffcc
| 11
| March 17
| Rain or Shine
| W 129–116 
| Manuel, Tautuaa (23)
| Perez, Tautuaa (12)
| Simon Enciso (11)
| PhilSports Arena
| 9–2

Playoffs

Bracket

Game log

|-bgcolor=ccffcc
| 1
| March 19
| Converge
| W 121–105
| Cameron Clark (40)
| Cameron Clark (13)
| Perez, Ross (5)
| Smart Araneta Coliseum
| 1–0

Transactions

Free agency

Signings

Trades

Philippine Cup

Mid-season

Commissioner's Cup

Recruited imports

References

San Miguel Beermen seasons
San Miguel Beermen